The External Affairs Directorate is a directorate of the Scottish Government, responsible for all aspects of Scotland's external affairs and international relationships with other countries and governments.

Membership

Cabinet Secretaries

 Angus Robertson, Cabinet Secretary for the Constitution, External Affairs and Culture
 Jenny Gilruth, Minister for Culture, Europe and International Development

Management of the directorate

 Ken Thomson, Director-General Constitution and External Affairs 
 Scott Wightman, Diretor, External Affairs

See also

 Scottish Government
 Directorates of the Scottish Government

References

Directorates of the Scottish Government